Sabrisho IV bar Qayyoma was Patriarch of the Church of the East from 1222 until his death in 1225.

Sources 
Brief accounts of Sabrisho's patriarchate are given in the Ecclesiastical Chronicle of the Jacobite writer Bar Hebraeus and in the ecclesiastical histories of the fourteenth-century Nestorian writers Amr and Sliba.

Modern assessments of his reign can be found in Jean-Maurice Fiey's Chrétiens syriaques sous les Abbassides and David Wilmshurst's The Martyred Church.

Sabrisho's patriarchate 
The following account of Sabrisho's patriarchate is given by Bar Hebraeus:

Yahballaha II was succeeded by Sabrisho, his nephew by his brother, also as a result of the gold which he conveyed to the governor by the hand of the celebrated Amin al-Dawla Abu'lkarim, son of Thomas, namely 7,000 dinars.  He died on the second Sunday of the month, on the eighth day of the sixth month of the year 622 of the Arabs (AD 1225/6), and was buried next to his uncle.  He was succeeded by Sabrisho bar Masihi.

See also
 List of patriarchs of the Church of the East

Notes

References
 Abbeloos, J. B., and Lamy, T. J., Bar Hebraeus, Chronicon Ecclesiasticum (3 vols, Paris, 1877)
 Assemani, J. A., De Catholicis seu Patriarchis Chaldaeorum et Nestorianorum (Rome, 1775)
 Brooks, E. W., Eliae Metropolitae Nisibeni Opus Chronologicum (Rome, 1910)
 Gismondi, H., Maris, Amri, et Salibae: De Patriarchis Nestorianorum Commentaria I: Amri et Salibae Textus (Rome, 1896)
 Gismondi, H., Maris, Amri, et Salibae: De Patriarchis Nestorianorum Commentaria II: Maris textus arabicus et versio Latina (Rome, 1899)

Patriarchs of the Church of the East
13th-century bishops of the Church of the East
Nestorians in the Abbasid Caliphate
1225 deaths